Wegerle is a surname. Notable people with the surname include:

Geoff Wegerle (born 1954), South African footballer, brother of Steve
Roy Wegerle (born 1964), American soccer player
Steve Wegerle (born 1953), South African footballer

See also
Wekerle